Zenodorus is a genus of the jumping spiders distributed from the Moluccas to Australia, including several islands of the Pacific. It was once considered a junior synonym of Omoedus, but this was later rejected by Jerzy Prószyński in 2017. At least one species, Z. orbiculatus, specializes on hunting ants.

Prószyński placed Zenodorus in his informal group "euophryines". When synonymized with Omoedus, it was placed in the large tribe Euophryini, part of the Salticoida clade of the subfamily Salticinae in Maddison's 2015 classification of the family Salticidae.

Species
, the World Spider Catalog accepted the following species:
 Zenodorus albertisi (Thorell, 1881) — Moluccas to Queensland
 Zenodorus arcipluvii (Peckham & Peckham, 1901) — New Hebrides, Australia
 Zenodorus brevis (Zhang & Maddison, 2012) — New Guinea
 Zenodorus danae Hogg, 1915 — New Guinea
 Zenodorus darleyorum (Zhang & Maddison, 2012) — New Guinea
 Zenodorus durvillei (Walckenaer, 1837) — New Guinea, Australia
 Zenodorus formosus (Rainbow, 1899) — Solomon Islands
 Zenodorus jucundus (Rainbow, 1912) — Northern Territory
 Zenodorus juliae (Thorell, 1881) — New Guinea
 Zenodorus lepidus (Guérin, 1834) — New Guinea
 Zenodorus marginatus (Simon, 1902) — Queensland
 Zenodorus metallescens (L. Koch, 1879) — Queensland, New Guinea
 Zenodorus meyeri (Zhang & Maddison, 2012) — New Guinea
 Zenodorus microphthalmus (L. Koch, 1881) — Pacific Islands
 Zenodorus niger (Karsch, 1878) — New South Wales
 Zenodorus obscurofemoratus (Keyserling, 1883) — New South Wales
 Zenodorus omundseni (Zhang & Maddison, 2012) — New Guinea
 Zenodorus orbiculatus (Keyserling, 1881) — Queensland, New South Wales
 Zenodorus papuanus (Zhang & Maddison, 2012) — New Guinea
 Zenodorus ponapensis Berry, Beatty & Prószynski, 1996 — Caroline Islands
 Zenodorus pupulus (Thorell, 1881) — Queensland
 Zenodorus pusillus (Strand, 1913) — Samoa, Tahiti
 Zenodorus rhodopae Hogg, 1915 — New Guinea
 Zenodorus semirasus (Keyserling, 1882) — Queensland
 Zenodorus swiftorum (Zhang & Maddison, 2012) — New Guinea
 Zenodorus syrinx Hogg, 1915 — New Guinea
 Zenodorus tortuosus (Zhang & Maddison, 2012) — New Guinea
 Zenodorus variatus Pocock, 1899 — Solomon Islands
 Zenodorus varicans (Thorell, 1881) — Queensland
 Zenodorus wangillus Strand, 1911 — Aru Islands

References

Salticidae
Salticidae genera